Fiza Junejo is a Pakistani politician who served as a member of the National Assembly of Pakistan from 2002 to 2013.

Early life
She was born to the former Prime Minister of Pakistan Muhammad Khan Junejo.

Political career
She was elected to the National Assembly of Pakistan as a candidate of Pakistan Muslim League (Q) on a seat reserved for women from Sindh in the 2008 Pakistani general election.

References

Pakistani MNAs 2008–2013
Pakistan Muslim League (Q) MNAs
Living people
Year of birth missing (living people)
Children of prime ministers of Pakistan
Pakistani MNAs 2002–2007
21st-century Pakistani women politicians